Department of Higher Education is the department under Ministry of Education, that oversees higher education in India.

The department is empowered to grant deemed university status to educational institutions on the advice of the University Grants Commission (UGC) of India, under Section 3 of the University Grants Commission (UGC) Act, 1956.

Organisation

The department is divided into eight bureaus, and most of the work of the department is handled through over 100 autonomous organisations under these bureaus:

 University and Higher Education;  Minorities Education 
 University Grants Commission (UGC)
 Indian Council of Social Science Research (ICSSR)
 Indian Council of Historical Research (ICHR)
 Indian Council of Philosophical Research (ICPR)
 7 Indian Institute of Science Education and Research (IISERs)
 38 Central Universities (including 15 new Central Universities which have been established w.e.f. 15.01.2009 by an ordinance promulgated by President of India)
 Indian Institute of Advanced Studies (IIAS), Shimla 
 All India Survey of Higher Education (AISHE) 
 Technical Education
 All India Council of Technical Education (AICTE)
 Council of Architecture (COA)
 5 Indian Institutes of Information Technology (IIITs) (Allahabad, Gwalior, Jabalpur and Kancheepuram,Kurnool)
 23 Indian Institutes of Technology (IITs)
 20 Indian Institutes of Management (IIMs)
 31 National Institutes of Technology (NITs)
 3 School of Planning and Architecture (SPAs)
 4 National Institutes of Technical Teachers’ Training & Research (NITTTRs)
 4 Regional Boards of Apprenticeship / Practical Training
 Administration and Languages
 Three Central Universities in the field of Sanskrit, viz. Central Sanskrit University, New Delhi, Shri Lal Bahadur Shastri National Sanskrit University, New Delhi, and National Sanskrit University, Tirupati  
 Kendriya Hindi Sansthan (KHS), Agra
 English and Foreign Language University (EFLU), Hyderabad
 National Council for Promotion of Urdu Language (NCPUL)
 National Council for Promotion of Sindhi Language (NCPSL)
 Three subordinate offices: Central Hindi Directorate (CHD), New Delhi; Commission for Scientific & Technological Terminology (CSTT), New Delhi; and Central Institute of Indian Languages, Mysore
 Distance Education and Scholarships
 Indira Gandhi National Open University (IGNOU) 
 UNESCO, International Cooperation, Book Promotion and Copyrights, Education Policy, Planning and Monitoring 
 Integrated Finance Division. 
 Statistics, Annual Plan and CMIS 
 Administrative Reform, North Eastern Region, SC/ST/OBC

Others: 
National Institute of Educational Planning and Administration (NIEPA) 
National Book Trust (NBT)
National Commission for Minority Educational Institutions (NCMEI)
National Council of Educational Research and Training (NCERT)
Central Board of Secondary Education (CBSE)  
Kendriya Vidyalaya Sangathan (KVS) 
Navodaya Vidyalaya Samiti (NVS)  
National Institute of Open Schooling (NIOS)  
Central Tibetan School Administration (CTSA)
National Foundation for Teachers' Welfare  
a public sector enterprise, Educational Consultants India Limited (EdCIL)

Notes and references

See also
 List of autonomous higher education institutes in India
 Education in India
 University Grants Commission (India)
 Department of Higher Education (Tamil Nadu)
 National Open School Institute

External links
 Department of Higher Education– Official website

 Loan Assistance for Higher Education

Higher education in India
Ministry of Education (India)
Year of establishment missing